Hestra (operating as Martin Magnusson & Co AB) is a family-owned company that designs and manufactures gloves. Founded by Martin Magnusson in 1936, the company makes gloves for Alpine and Freeskiing.

The company's flagship store is in Stockholm, Sweden.

History

1936

Martin Magnusson start manufacturing gloves in Hestra, Småland. The first gloves were work gloves for lumberjacks. The gloves were made from strong leather and reinforced with rivets to withstand the hard work in the forest.

1937

Slalom skiing comes to Hestra. A slalom slope is established at the local mountain Isaberg. Skiers arrive by train to try the new sport.

1963

The second generation takes over.

2017

Hestra upgraded its Patrol Gloves.

See also

List of companies of Sweden
Seth Morrison

References

External links
Hestra Official Website
Nitrile Disposable Gloves
Latex Examination Gloves

Sporting goods manufacturers of Sweden
Clothing brands of Sweden
Clothing companies of Sweden
Gloves
Ski equipment manufacturers
Companies based in Jönköping County